Athol Scott Cooper (24 October 1892 – 21 December 1970) was an English-born Australian politician.

He was born in London to clothier Charles Henry Cooper and Mary Esther Scott. He migrated to Australia around 1910 and served with the Australian Imperial Force during World War I. At around 1922 he married Dorothy Jean Holmes, with whom he had two daughters. He became a farmer, first in New South Wales and then in the Mallee. In 1932 he was elected to the Victorian Legislative Assembly as the United Australia Party member for Dundas, but the narrowness of the result prompted a recount which Cooper lost, and his period as an MP ended. He later moved to Dandenong, and died in Mitcham in 1970.

References

1892 births
1970 deaths
United Australia Party members of the Parliament of Victoria
Members of the Victorian Legislative Assembly
20th-century Australian politicians